Saidt Mustafá Céspedes (born 26 November 1989) is a Bolivian professional footballer who plays for Club Deportivo Guabirá as a goalkeeper.

International career
Born in Bolivia, Mustafá is of Palestinian descent. On 3 March 2019 Mustafá made his debut for the Bolivia national football team against Nicaragua.

References

External links
 
 
 
 

1989 births
Living people
Sportspeople from Santa Cruz de la Sierra
Bolivian footballers
Bolivia international footballers
Bolivian people of Palestinian descent
Association football goalkeepers
Bolivian Primera División players
Sport Boys Warnes players
Club Bolívar players
Guabirá players